General Abdullahi Ali Omar, a.k.a. Daad, is a Somali military official. He previously served as Somalia's Chief of Army.

Biography
Omar hails from the town of Galkayo, situated in the north-central Mudug region of Somalia.

In his younger years, he studied at Jamal Abdel Nasser High School in Mogadishu before joining the army. He is from  Meheri clan

Omar later served as Chief of Staff of the armed forces in Puntland. On 10 February 2007, he was appointed Chief of Army of the Transitional Federal Government. He held the position until 21 July 2007, when he was replaced with Salah Hassan Jama and reassigned to a post in the Ministry of Internal Affairs.

References

Living people
Somalian military leaders
1947 births
Somalian generals